The Conservative Democratic Party was a political party in Greece in the 1920s and 1930s led by Andreas Michalakopoulos.

History
The party first contested national elections in 1928, winning five seats in the parliamentary elections with 1.6% of the vote. The party also won five seats in the Senate elections the following year.

The 1932 elections saw the party lose all its seats in both the Vouli and the Senate. Although, it regained two seats in the Vouli in the 1933 elections, the party did not contest any further elections.

References

Defunct political parties in Greece
Conservative parties in Greece